The Organised and Financial Crime Agency of New Zealand (OFCANZ), generally referred to as the Organised Crime Agency, is an agency hosted within the New Zealand Police. The agency's stated objective is to "disrupt and combat organised crime". The agency has been recently renamed the National Organised Crime Group (2018) however the objective remains as stated.

The Fifth Labour Government in 2007 announced the intention to create the agency, saying it would replace the Serious Fraud Office. OFCANZ was formed on 1 July 2008 (though in December 2008, the new National Prime Minister John Key said that the Serious Fraud Office would not be abolished).

The agency led its first raid on 28 October 2009, serving search warrants on members of the Tribesmen Motorcycle Club in Northland.

References

External links 
OFCANZ Homepage

Government agencies of New Zealand
Specialist law enforcement agencies of New Zealand
2008 establishments in New Zealand
Government agencies established in 2008
Government finances in New Zealand
Organised crime in New Zealand